The Thomas van der Hammen Natural Reserve or Thomas van der Hammen Forest Reserve is an area of the Bogotá savanna that is under environmental protection. The natural reserve was declared as such in year 2000 by the Ministry of Environment and Sustainable development. It takes its name from the Dutch-Colombian geologist Thomas van der Hammen who devoted his life to the research of the region.

The protection area has the purpose of creating an urban forest that connects the Bogotá River and the Eastern Hills of Bogotá, to preserve the underground water sources, improve the quality of the air and protect the diversity and activities of the animal species that exist there.

Mayor of Bogotá Enrique Peñalosa has proposed construction in the Reserve that could host 1.5 million people.

Flora and fauna 

The Thomas van der Hammen Natural Reserve is a rich natural area important for the biodiversity of the Bogotá savanna. Several endemic species have been registered, and two newly described species of butterflies were discovered in the Reserve.

Fauna

Birds 
In the area of the reserve 187 species of birds have been registered, some of which are endangered. Two species, registered in the past; Cistothorus apolinari and Polystictus pectoralis have not been reported recently.

Mammals 
Registered mammals are among others guinea pigs, Andean white-eared opossum (Didelphis pernigra), tigrillo (Leopardus tigrinus), long-tailed weasel (Mustela frenata), and eleven species of bats.

Bats

Butterflies 
With 350 endemic species, Colombia occupies the first position worldwide in diversity of butterflies and after Peru, the second place in total number of registered butterfly species (3274). The Thomas van der Hammen Natural Reserve contains 23 (new studies report more than 26 with two new species in the genus Satyrinae discovered) species of butterflies. Other species of butterflies have been registered:

Gallery

See also 

 Biodiversity of Colombia
 List of national parks of Colombia
 Wetlands of Bogotá

References

Bibliography

External links 
  Bogotá diversa

Geography of Bogotá
Geography of Cundinamarca Department
Altiplano Cundiboyacense
Nature reserves in Colombia
Protected areas established in 2000
2000 establishments in Colombia